Lovro Radonić (February 25, 1928 – July 31, 1990) was a Croat water polo player and butterfly swimmer who competed for Yugoslavia in the 1952, 1956, and 1960 Summer Olympics. He was born in Korčula, Kingdom of Serbs, Croats and Slovenes. Radonjić was part of the Yugoslav team which won the silver medal in the 1952 tournament. He played all nine matches. Four years later he won again the silver medal with the Yugoslav team in the 1956 tournament. He played six matches. In 1960 he participated in the 200 metre butterfly competition but was eliminated in the first round. He was born in Korčula and died in Rijeka.

See also
 List of Olympic medalists in water polo (men)

References

External links
 

1928 births
1990 deaths
People from Korčula
Croatian male water polo players
Croatian male swimmers
Yugoslav male water polo players
Yugoslav male swimmers
Olympic water polo players of Yugoslavia
Olympic swimmers of Yugoslavia
Water polo players at the 1952 Summer Olympics
Water polo players at the 1956 Summer Olympics
Swimmers at the 1960 Summer Olympics
Olympic silver medalists for Yugoslavia
Olympic medalists in water polo
Medalists at the 1956 Summer Olympics
Medalists at the 1952 Summer Olympics